Jeffrey Hirschfield is co-developer of the science fiction series Lexx. He wrote for three of its four seasons and voiced the character of the robot head 790.

Hirschfield is also creator of the live action/animation sci-fi adventure series Zixx and served as series story editor and wrote five of the first thirteen episodes.

Hirschfield co-created El Mundo del Lundo for Canada's Comedy Network, on which he also performed. Further writing credits include The Outer Limits, I Was A Sixth Grade Alien, Olliver's Adventures and Starhunter. He has also written a number of stage plays and radio dramas.

References

External links 
 

Living people
Year of birth missing (living people)
Canadian television writers
Canadian male voice actors